The Somerset Coal Canal (originally known as the Somersetshire Coal Canal) was a narrow canal in England, built around 1800. Its route began in basins at Paulton and Timsbury, ran to nearby Camerton, over two aqueducts at Dunkerton, through a tunnel at Combe Hay, then via Midford and Monkton Combe to Limpley Stoke where it joined the Kennet and Avon Canal. This link gave the Somerset coalfield (which at its peak contained 80 collieries) access east toward London. From Midford an arm also ran via Writhlington to Radstock, with a tunnel at Wellow.

A feature of the canal was the variety of methods used at Combe Hay to overcome height differences between the upper and lower reaches: initially by the use of caisson locks; when this method failed an inclined plane trackway; and finally a flight of 22 conventional locks.

The Radstock arm was never commercially successful and was replaced first with a tramway in 1815 and later incorporated into the Somerset and Dorset Joint Railway. The Paulton route flourished for nearly 100 years and was very profitable, carrying high tonnages of coal for many decades; this canal helped carry the fuel that powered the nearby city of Bath.

By the 1880s, coal production declined as the various pits either ran out of coal or were flooded and then closed.  In 1896 the main pump at Dunkerton, which maintained the canal water level, failed. The resultant lowering in level meant that only small loads could be transported, which reduced revenue, thus the canal company could not afford a replacement pump.

The canal became disused after 1898 and officially closed in 1902, being sold off to the various railway companies who were expanding their networks.

In September 2014, restoration work began on the canal section from Paulton to Radford, with the aim of restoring the entire canal to navigation in the future.

History

Background

In 1763 coal was discovered in Radstock and mining began in the area, but transport was a major problem because of the poor state of the roads. This cost and the potential for cheaper delivery of coal from south Wales via the Monmouthshire Canal led to the proposal for a canal which could transport the coal to Bath and Wiltshire. Initial surveys were conducted during 1793 by William Jessop and William Smith under the direction of John Rennie who presented the report on 14 October 1793 estimating the cost of construction of the canal at £80,000. Smith, who also worked at the Mearns Pit at High Littleton, made the original observations leading to his important stratification theory by observing the dips in the geological strata through which the canal was cut. Smith became Surveyor to the company, but was dismissed in April 1799, apparently because he had used his position as surveyor to buy a local house at advantageous terms. He then set himself up in a private practice in Bath but was re-engaged by the company in 1811, to provide advice when repairs became necessary to the canal bed.

The canal was authorised by an Act of Parliament entitled "An Act for making and maintaining a navigable Canal, with certain Railways and Stone Roads, from several Collieries in the county of Somerset, to communicate with the intended Kennet and Avon Canal, in the parish of Bradford, in the county of Wilts" of 1794, and further detailed surveys were carried out by Robert Whitworth and John Sutcliffe, who was then appointed as chief engineer.

Construction
In May 1795, tenders were invited for the first section to be built from the meadows near Goosehard (or Gooseyard) near Paulton to Hopyard in the parish of Camerton. In June 1795 a contractor, Houghton & Son from Shropshire, started the terminus at Paulton meadows using local labour. This first section of the canal was completed on Monday 1 October 1798; the first load of coal carried on the canal was delivered to Bath via Dunkerton. Some 14 collieries at Timsbury and Paulton were connected to their respective basins in the meadow terminus by tramways; this required the construction of three tramway bridges over the Cam brook. A further bridge at Upper Radford was required over the canal; at this point tramways connected the Withy Mills and Radford workings. The course of the Cam brook was modified at various places to protect the canal from erosion. In 1799 William Whitmore and his partner, Norton, offered to build a balance (or geometrical) lift without payment, on condition that if successful they were to have £17,300 and a royalty of 4 pence per ton of goods passed.

The design of the caisson lock at Combe Hay was not a success: on 15 February 1798 the first descent failed. Mr Weldon (the inventor) made one successful descent on 7 June and said "I will undertake to pass 1,500 tons of goods through the lock in 12 hrs". Tenders were invited on 28 June for further constructions. Two more attempts to use the lock took place on 11 April and 2 May, but only the latter was successful. By 22 August 1799 the second rebuilding of the caisson had been abandoned. It was replaced by three locks and an inclined plane trackway, but the trackway was not successful either, and the company proposed to raise more money to finance the building of a flight of 19 locks to replace it, the use of which would incur an additional toll of one shilling per ton on all traffic. This was vigorously opposed by the owners of the Kennet and Avon Canal and the Wilts and Berks Canal, on the grounds that the price of coal to their customers would be too high. After negotiation, the company obtained a new Act of Parliament on 30 April 1802, which authorised the formation of a separate body called "The Lock Fund of the Somerset Coal Canal Company", with powers to raise the sum of £45,000. The money was raised by the Kennet and Avon, the Wilts and Berks and the Somerset Coal Canal each contributing £15,000, and the one shilling surcharge was to be levied until the capital had been repaid, after which it would cease. The act set the tonnage rates to be charged:

Fractions of a Mile to pay for Half a Mile, and of a Ton as a Quarter of a Ton; Rates for Wharfage to be determined by the Company. In addition to the above Rates, One Shilling per Ton is paid on all Goods to the Lock Fund, which also receives Three Farthings per Ton from the Coal Canal company.

The boats were weighed at Midford, where a weigh house was built in 1831. Boats were floated into a one-ended lock, the gate closed and the water drained. This left the boat resting on a cradle suspended by angled rods attached to a beam which took the weight of the boat. One-pound weights were then added to a pan, with one pound being equivalent to one hundredweight, until the system was in equilibrium, then the weight was recorded. The weigh house at Midford was one of only four known to have been built in England and Wales.

Operation
The canal opened in 1805 and was used for passenger traffic as well as coal. In 1814 the Benedictine monks who came to Downside Abbey are said to have used the canal for the last stage of their journey. Another cargo carried by the canal was limestone from Combe Down. The peak level of cargo carried was in 1838 at 138,403 tons resulting in over £17,000 of tolls being paid. Cargoes of over 100,000 tons were common until the 1870s when the decline in output of coal from the various Somerset coalpits, along with competition from the railways, dramatically reduced the canal's profitability.  When the main pump at Dunkerton failed it was not replaced and there was not sufficient water for continual operation of the locks.  The canal went into liquidation in 1894; it closed in 1898 and was finally abandoned in 1904 when it was sold to the Great Western Railway for £2,000, and used as a branch of the Bristol and North Somerset Railway. The closure caused problems across the Somerset coalfield especially to the pits along the Paulton branch, which had relied on the canal for transportation.

The Radstock branch
When the Radstock branch was constructed, it was intended to link it to the main line of the Paulton branch at Midford, which was at a lower level at this point. The Lock Fund created in 1802 was to have paid for the construction of the locks, but because there was little regular traffic on the branch, the company built one lock, an aqueduct over the Midford Brook, and a short tramway to bridge the gap. This contributed to the economic failure of the branch, and its replacement by a tramway in 1815. The tramway was laid along the former canal's towpath. It was single-line with passing places every , and was originally laid using cast iron plates on stone block sleepers, but was relaid using wrought iron plates.

Engineers and surveyors

 William Bennet (d. 1826)
 John Hodgkinson
 Benjamin Outram (1764–1805)
 John Rennie (1761–1821)
 William Smith (1769–1839)
 John Sutcliffe
 Robert Weldon (?1754–1810)
 Robert Whitworth (d. 1799)
Data from Jim Shead's Waterways Information.

Combe Hay and the caisson lock

The Cam brook was an inadequate source of water above Camerton, and the mills along it had water rights. As a result, the canal was designed with all 22 locks in one flight near Combe Hay and a pumping engine to raise water from the Cam; this was the first canal to depend entirely on pumping.

A potential solution to the water supply problem was the use of caisson locks as proposed by Robert Weldon, three of which could replace the 22 conventional locks, because it wasted no water, but the technology had only been tried in a one-third scale prototype. The box was demonstrated to the Prince Regent (later George IV), but had engineering problems and was never successful commercially or built elsewhere.

It was temporarily replaced with an inclined plane by Benjamin Outram who had successfully installed inclined planes at the Peak Forest Canal in Derbyshire, whilst 22 locks and a Boulton & Watt Steam Pumping Station, capable of lifting 5,000 tons of water in 12 hours, were built to the latest design with metal plate clad wooden gates.

Construction
 
The two images show a spillway drain from  1796 (uncovered in 2009–10) at Upper Midford, a location where a caisson to take the canal from the  level to the  level at Midford Aqueduct was proposed.

Each caisson would have had such a drain for maintenance purposes over the exit arch made to the same dimensions. The following extract from the Bath Herald newspaper provides the details of the chosen sites:

14 Jun 1798 Travel: Somerset coal canal – caisson cisterns to be formed at Combe Hay & nr. Midford. Sealed proposals reqd. on embanking & excavation with the masonry; or each separately – send to sub-committee, Waldegrave Arms, Radstock 20 Jul Plans & specs. on appl.

For further Newspaper articles see s:Bath Georgian Newspaper - Somerset Coal Canal

Paulton and Timsbury basins

located between the villages of Paulton and Timsbury was the terminus of the northern branch of the Somerset Coal Canal and was a central point for at least 15 collieries around Paulton, Timsbury and High Littleton, which were connected to the canal by tramroads.

On the northern side of Timsbury basin was the terminus for the tramroads which served Old Grove, Prior's, Tyning and Hayeswood pits, with a branch line to Amesbury and Mearns pits. Parts of this line were still in use in 1873, probably all carrying horse-drawn wagons of coal. Tramroads on the southern side of the Paulton basin served Brittens, Littleborrok, Paulton Ham, Paulton Hill, Simons Hill terminating at Salisbury Colliery. In addition the Paulton Foundry used this line. The entire line was disused by 1871 as were the collieries it served.

The area has been designated as an 'area of special architectural or historic interest, the character or appearance of which it is desirable to preserve or enhance' under section 69 of the Planning (Listed Buildings and Conservation Areas) Act 1990.

Coming of the railway

The first railway to affect the canal was the Bristol and North Somerset Railway's Frome to Radstock line completed in 1854 which took traffic away from the tramway. It finally closed in 1874 with the Somerset and Dorset Railway's extension to Bath, built along its route from Radstock to Midford. Another branch line was constructed in 1882 from Hallatrow to Camerton, running alongside the canal for the last  of its route.

The Great Western Railway built a railway line (the Bristol and North Somerset Railway) over some parts of the canal route from Limpley Stoke to Camerton, where it joined the existing 1882 branch line from Hallatrow to Camerton. This opened in 1910 for passenger and goods traffic, closed for the First World War, re-opened after the war, ran for passengers only for two more years in the mid-1920s and finally closed to all traffic in the 1950s. The line was used in the 1950s Ealing comedy film The Titfield Thunderbolt.

Present day
The route of the canal lies in a largely agricultural area, dotted with small villages linked by minor roads. Several stretches of the Paulton and Timsbury basins branch are easily visible, and various stretches and features were surveyed in 2014. Full restoration of the entire length from Paulton to Dundas is being explored. It may no longer be feasible to reinstate the original locks 16, 17, 18 and 19 structures for this section.

Most of the canal features along the entire route are on private land but the towpath survives in places as a right of way, while the later railway between Midford to Wellow has been surfaced to form part of National Cycle Route 24. It has been proposed that a statue, commissioned by Sustrans, of William Smith, the father of English Geology, will be sited next to the path on the line of the canal commemorating his work as its surveyor and his recognition of the significance of rock strata.

Restoration works

Limpley Stoke

The  stretch at Brassknocker Basin where the canal joins the Kennet and Avon at Dundas Aqueduct was restored during the 1980s and is now a thriving marina with moorings.

Paulton and Timsbury basins

Work started in 2013 to reveal and excavate the drydock next to the eastern Paulton Basin.

The drainage culvert at the southeast corner of the drydock was rebuilt in December 2013, and the drydock itself completely excavated in April 2014. The entrance to the drydock, at the western end, was surmounted by a bridge, partially demolished in 2002 but rebuilt during 2014.

Withy Mills

Excavations began in May 2014 at Terminus Bridge; the abutments were found to be in poor condition; an earth bund between the abutments carried the public footpath and stopped the water draining from the Paulton and Timsbury Basins.

Work resumed in September and November 2014 to batter and reshape the canal embankments. Vertical infills of white clay have been used along this wall.

Grant to study history of the canal

The canal has been studied for many years with exploration and restoration work being undertaken in Wellow and elsewhere. Particular effort, so far unsuccessful, has been put into trying to find the site of the second and third caisson locks at Combe Hay. In October 2006 a grant of £20,000 was obtained from the Heritage Lottery Fund, by the Somersetshire Coal Canal Society in association with Bath & North East Somerset Council and the Avon Industrial Buildings Trust to carry out a technical study on one of the locks and associated structures at Combe Hay. Many of the locks and associated workings are listed buildings.

Route and points of interest

See also

Canals of Great Britain
History of the British canal system

References

Bibliography

External links

 Somersetshire Coal Canal Society website
 Richard Stevens site about the canal
 Download a detailed route map of the Somersetshire Coal Canal
image & map of mile marker seen nr the route of the Somerset Coal Canal

1805 establishments in England
1904 disestablishments in England
Bath and North East Somerset
Canals in Somerset
History of Somerset
Industrial archaeological sites in Somerset
Somerset coalfield
Canals opened in 1805

fr:Canal à charbon du Somersetshire